Man of God is a 2021 English-language Greek biographical drama film written and directed by Yelena Popovic and starring Aris Servetalis as Nectarios of Aegina and also starring Mickey Rourke and Alexander Petrov.

Synopsis 
Man of God brings to life the incredible true story of Saint Nectarios of Aegina, Greece. A priest of the common people, his humility annoyed the prideful orthodox clergy of the day. In contrast to his religious superiors – the bishops and patriarchs mesmerized by worldly honors and power – Nectarios cared for the poor; taught peasant girls to read and write; inspired by example young men to enter the priesthood; and wrote books and delivered sermons that uplifted nations of believers. In this exquisitely made film, relive Nectarios' inspiring devotion and perseverance as, despite the efforts of the religious establishment to discredit him and dismantle his good works over decades, he embraced humility and inspired thousands to become one of Greece's most renowned saints.

Cast
 Aris Servetalis as Nectarios of Aegina
 Mickey Rourke as Paralyzed Man
 Alexander Petrov as Kostas
 Tonia Sotiropoulou as Maria
 Babis Hawk Konstantinou as Rich man
 Constantin Symsiris as Prosecutor clerk
 Giannis Stankoglou as Spiros
 Manos Gavras as Yannis
 Christos Loulis as Christos
 Kitty Paitazoglou as Nun Akakia
 Samuel Akinola as Baker
 Michalis Ikonomou as Vassili
 Dimitra Mesimerli as Client
 Karyofyllia Karabeti as Voula
 Alexandros Mylonas as Metropolitan Meletius
 Pavlos Kourtidis as Raggedy Man
 Lefteris Tsatsis as Hermit
 Yannis Anastasakis as Metropolitan Theoklitos
 Vera Letizia Muratova as Chrisafenia
 Nikitas Tsakiroglou as Patriarch Sophronius IV of Alexandria
 Onoufrios Dovletis as Villager (credit only)
 Mario Lazaridis as Deacon
 Sarantis Geogleris as Gregory
 Petra Mavridi as Confessor woman
 Konstantinos Kladis as Fisherman

Production
Principal photography wrapped in Greece in September 2020.

Release
The film made its world premiere on April 25, 2021 at the Moscow International Film Festival, where it won the Audience Award.  It was then released in theaters on August 26, 2021. The film's opening four consecutive weeks sold 241,014 tickets in Greece.

References

External links
 
 

2021 films
Films about Orthodoxy
Films about Christianity
2021 biographical drama films
Greek biographical drama films
English-language Greek films
Films shot in Greece
2020s English-language films